The Corning Museum of Glass is a museum in Corning, New York in the United States, dedicated to the art, history, and science of glass. It was founded in 1951 by Corning Glass Works and currently has a collection of more than 50,000 glass objects, some over 3,500 years old.

History 
The Corning Museum of Glass (CMOG) is a not-for-profit museum dedicated to glass, first created as the Corning Glass Center, in 1951. It was built by Corning Glass Works (renamed Corning Incorporated in 1989) upon the company's 100th anniversary. Thomas S. Buechner, who would later become director of the Brooklyn Museum, was the founding director of the glass museum, serving in the post from 1951 to 1960 and again from 1973 to 1980.

Growth and renovations 

The original museum and library were housed in a building designed by Harrison & Abramovitz in 1951. Gunnar Birkerts designed a new addition, which was opened on May 28, 1980.

The Studio opened for classes in 1996.

The museum was renovated in 2001, with exhibitions designed by Ralph Appelbaum Associates. 

In 2012, the museum again expanded, with a redesign by Thomas Phifer. The Contemporary Art + Design Wing opened on March 20, 2015.

In 2015 Karol Wight was appointed president and executive director of the museum. She is also curator of ancient and Islamic glass at the museum.

Additions would include a 120-seat theater with display space, a large-scale kiln-casting center, and a technology center. The expansion will provide space for artists and students in a new certificate program in glass.

1972 flood 
In June 1972, the museum was severely damaged following Hurricane Agnes. A case holding 600 rare books was tipped over, and the books were covered by mud and shards of glass panes. Half of the entire Library collection was damaged in the flood. According to Martin and Edwards, 528 of the museum's 13,000 objects had sustained damage.

During the extensive recovery efforts, the library occupied an abandoned Acme grocery store across the street from the museum. Altogether, staff and volunteers dried, cleaned, and restored over 7,000 water-logged, frozen books over the next two years. The rare books were sent to Carolyn Price Horton, a leading restoration expert, who disassembled, washed, deacidified, and rebound them. On August 1, 1972, the museum reopened with restoration work still underway.

The Glass Collection

Galleries 
The museum's collection of contemporary artworks includes pieces by significant artists such as Klaus Moje, Karen LaMonte, Dale Chihuly, Libenský / Brychtová, Ginny Ruffner and Josiah McElheny. The galleries include: Glass in Nature, Origins of Glassmaking, Glass of the Romans, Glass in the Islamic World, Early Northern European Glass, The Rise of Venetian Glassmaking, Glass in 17th-19th Century Europe, 19th Century European Glass, Asian Glass, Glass in America, Corning: From Farm Town to “Crystal City,” Paperweights of the World and Modern Glass.

In addition to these galleries, there is the Jerome and Lucille Strauss Study Gallery, Frederick Carder Gallery, Ben W. Heineman Sr. Gallery of Contemporary Glass, and the Contemporary Glass Gallery.

The museum's Ben W. Heineman Sr. Gallery of Contemporary Glass focuses on vessels, objects, sculptures, and installations made by international artists from 1975 to 2010. The purpose of the gallery is to show the different ways in which glass is used in art, craft, and design. The gallery is named for the Ben W. Heineman Sr. family, who donated a major collection of contemporary glass to the museum in 2005.

Exhibitions 
The Corning Museum of Glass offers exhibitions year-round. Past exhibitions have included: Medieval Glass for Popes, Princes and Peasants, East Meets West: Cross-Cultural Influences in Glassmaking in the 18th and 19th Centuries and Mirror to Discovery: The 200-Inch Disk and the Hale Reflecting Telescope at Palomar. Several special exhibitions are offered at the museum and the Rakow Research Library each year, from shows focused on specific artists to major exhibitions on important topics in glass and glass history.

The Rakow Commission 
Inaugurated in 1986 by The Corning Museum of Glass, the Rakow Commission supports the development of new works of art in glass. This program, which provides $25,000 each year, is made possible through the generosity of the late Dr. and Mrs. Leonard S. Rakow, who were museum fellows, friends, and benefactors of the museum. Each commissioned work is added to the museum's collection and is displayed publicly for the first time during the annual Seminar.

Selected collection highlights

Glassmaking 
Guests can watch live glassmaking, or learn to make glass at the museum. The live glassmaking demonstrations are major visitor attractions. Demonstrations happen live in Corning every day, as well as on three Celebrity cruise ships.

The museum offers several live glassmaking demonstrations that allow visitors to get a better understanding of both the art and science of glassmaking.  The Hot Glass Show is a demonstration where one of the museum's glass blowers provides a live glass-blowing demonstration, which is also narrated by another of the glass blowers. The Hot Glass Show is performed at the museum, on the road, and at sea on three Celebrity Cruise ships.

At the museum, the Hot Glass Show is offered daily and is included in the cost of admission. At each demonstration, the glassmaker takes a glob of molten glass and shapes the globs into vases, bowls, or sculptures. Throughout the demonstration, a narrator describes the process, and cameras give viewers a close-up look into the furnaces where the glass is heated. The show gives viewers a look into an ancient Roman technique that is still used today for glass making. Each show lasts between 20 and 40 minutes. The museum takes the Hot Glass Show on the road, bringing the demonstration to the public, designers, and other museums in the US and abroad.

GlassLab 
GlassLab is the design program at the Corning Museum of Glass. GlassLab's focus on material and process aims to help designers and artists realize new forms, functions and meanings for glass. The program is by invitation only and provides designers with access to explore concepts in glass. GlassLab designers come from various disciplines, such as product, graphic, and fashion design. In public "design performances" or private workshops, designers and glassmakers collaborate, rapidly prototyping design concepts.

Research 

The Corning Museum of Glass actively researches, publishes, and provides lectures about a range of glass topics. The museum hosts The Rakow Research Library, which houses a collection of materials on the art and history of glass and glassmaking, and is open to the public.

Rakow Research Library 
The Rakow Research Library, founded as part of The Corning Museum of Glass in 1951, is a public institution that houses the world's most comprehensive collection of materials on the art and history of glass and glassmaking. The library Collection ranges from medieval manuscripts to original works of art on paper to the latest information on techniques used by studio artists. More than 130 archives contain unique material from individual artists, galleries, companies, scholars, and organizations. The library also presents exhibitions featuring rare items from its collection. In 1985, the museum renamed its library the Leonard S. and Juliette K. Rakow Library in honor of donors Dr. and Mrs. Rakow. The collection does not circulate. However, the library is a member of the Online Computer Library Center (OCLC), an international bibliographic service, and microfiche copies of books on glass and photocopies of periodical articles can be borrowed through interlibrary loan.

References

External links

Virtual tour of the Corning Museum of Glass provided by Google Arts & Culture

 
Museums in Steuben County, New York
Glass museums and galleries in the United States
History of glass
Science museums in New York (state)
Art museums and galleries in New York (state)
History museums in New York (state)
Museums established in 1951
Corning, New York
Corning Inc.
1951 establishments in New York (state)
Harrison & Abramovitz buildings
Institutions accredited by the American Alliance of Museums